Apti Alkhazurovich Davtaev is a Russian professional boxer.

Professional career
Davtaev made his professional debut on 30 March 2013, scoring a second-round stoppage victory via corner retirement (RTD) against Ivan Bogdanov at the Galich Hall in Krasnodar, Russia.

After winning his first eight fights, all by stoppage, he fought Ante Verunica to a split draw (SD) over six rounds on 18 October 2014. In his next fight he faced Jakov Gospic for the vacant WBC-CISBB heavyweight title on  11 July 2015 at the GETEC Arena in Magdeburg, Germany. Davtaev captured his first professional via second-round knockout (KO). The bout was part of the undercard of the WBA (Regular) heavyweight title fight between Ruslan Chagaev and Francesco Pianeta.

After scoring another five wins, four by stoppage, he faced German Skobenko for the vacant WBA Asia heavyweight title on 5 September 2018 at the Amphitheatre in Grozny, Russia. Davtaev defeated Skobenko via sixth-round technical knockout (TKO) to capture his second regional title by a major sanctioning body.

Following a first-round KO victory against Richard Carmack in February 2019, Davtaev defeated Pedro Otas via fifth-round KO to capture the WBC-ABC Continental heavyweight title. The bout took place on 18 April at the Colosseum Sport Hall in Grozny.

Professional boxing record

References

Living people
Year of birth missing (living people)
Date of birth missing (living people)
Russian male boxers
Heavyweight boxers
Chechen people	
Chechen sportsmen	
Russian people of Chechen descent